"Chaotic" is a song by Canadian singer Tate McRae, released on March 25, 2022, by RCA Records as the third single from her debut studio album I Used to Think I Could Fly, released on May 27, 2022. The song was produced by Greg Kurstin, and written by McRae, Kurstin and Victoria Zaro.

Background and release
McRae first teased the song on TikTok on February 14, 2022. The song sparked a trend where users would juxtapose clips of themselves crying in private with other clips where they appear perfectly happy and content, suggesting projecting happiness outwardly while going through a lot internally, to correspond with the lyrics "You said it looks like I've been going through hell. How did you know, how could you tell?" She announced the release date of the song on March 14, 2022.

Composition and lyrics 
"Chaotic" is a piano ballad with strings. McRae has described the song as "the most personal song she's ever written", and notes that it discusses her fears. The song discusses growing pains and fears, and has been described as "a bluesy reflection on how hard it can be to change, to grow up, and leave behind old habits and old relationships."

Critical reception 
The song received positive reviews from critics, praising the lyrics, production and McRae's vocal performance, though some fans wished that it wasn't released as a single. Caitlin White of Uproxx notes that the song sits comfortably within McRae's sad-streaked palette. Writing for Stereogum, Rachel Brodsky remarks, that the song is well-executed with a "lovely hook, smartly deployed strings, and some stylish distorted vocals around the edges of the chorus." The song has been praised for accurately capturing the pain and glum of growing up, and for McRae's emotional delivery. Chaotic has also been described as a "flawless pop song", while the production has been highlighted as dreamy and "adding to the dramatic and overwhelming feelings that the song embodies."

Credits 
Credits adapted from Tidal.
 Tate McRae – vocals, composer, lyricist
 Greg Kurstin – composer, lyricist, producer, engineer, bass, drums, keyboards, piano, synthesizer
 Victoria Zaro – composer, lyricist
 Dave Kutch – mastering engineer
 Mark Stent – mixing engineer
 Dave Cook – engineer
 Julian Burg – engineer
 Matt Wolach – assistant engineer

Charts

Certifications

Release history

References

2022 singles
2022 songs
Tate McRae songs
RCA Records singles
Songs written by Tate McRae
Songs written by Greg Kurstin
Song recordings produced by Greg Kurstin